Rovlan Muradov (born on 28 March 1998) is an Azerbaijani professional footballer who plays as a winger for Gabala in the Azerbaijan Premier League.

Career

Club
On 11 May 2019, Muradov made his debut in the Azerbaijan Premier League for Gabala match against Sumgayit.

Career statistics

Club

Honours
Gabala
Azerbaijan Cup (1): 2018–19

References

External links
 

1998 births
Living people
Association football midfielders
Azerbaijani footballers
Azerbaijan under-21 international footballers
Azerbaijan youth international footballers
Azerbaijani expatriate footballers
Expatriate footballers in the Czech Republic
Azerbaijan Premier League players
Gabala FC players
SK Slavia Prague players
Qarabağ FK players